Margaret "Peggy" Fitts (November 15, 1923 – July 17, 2011) was an American screenwriter and television writer active from the 1940s through the 1960s.

Biography 
Margaret was the daughter of L. Nathaniel and Eleanor Fitts, and she was born and raised in Los Angeles, where she attended the Westlake School. She later graduated from Stanford University, and afterward, she began writing films at MGM. She married Capitol Records executive Francis Marion Scott III in 1953. She wrote a string of films between 1949 and 1956, and mostly concentrated on TV writing through the 1960s.

Selected filmography 

 The King and Four Queens (1956)
 Moonfleet (1955)
 City Story (1954)
 Talk About a Stranger (1952)
 Stars in My Crown (1950)
 The Sun Comes Up (1949)

References

External links

American women screenwriters
Stanford University alumni
Harvard-Westlake School alumni
1923 births
2011 deaths
American television writers
American women television writers
Screenwriters from California
20th-century American screenwriters
20th-century American women writers
Writers from Los Angeles
21st-century American women